Final league standings for the 1910-11 St. Louis Soccer League.

League standings

External links
St. Louis Soccer Leagues (RSSSF)
The Year in American Soccer - 1911

1910-11
1910–11 domestic association football leagues
1910–11 in American soccer
St Louis Soccer
St Louis Soccer